All Is Well is a 2015 Indian Hindi-language romantic comedy-drama film directed by Umesh Shukla and produced by Bhushan Kumar, Krishan Kumar, Shyam Bajaj and Varun Bajaj and co-produced by Ajay Kapoor. It stars Abhishek Bachchan, Asin Thottumkal, Rishi Kapoor, and Supriya Pathak. The film tackles a thorny issue with a social message similar to Shukla's previous venture OMG – Oh My God!. The official trailer of the film was released on 1 July 2015 on YouTube and os, the film released on 21 August 2015. It marked the first film of Asin after a 3-year-hiatus and the last film appearance of Asin, before her marriage on 23 January 2016 and subsequent retirement from the film industry. The film's title is based on a song from 3 Idiots.

Plot
The film starts off with Inder Bhalla (Abhishek Bachchan), an aspiring song composer getting kicked out of his house by his father, Bhajanglal (Rishi Kapoor). Bhajanglal runs a bakery that doesn't really "run". He wants Inder to work at the bakery, but due to Inder's ambitions on becoming a successful song composer, he clearly refuses. Bhajanglal finds this an insult and sends Inder out of his house thinking that he is arrogant and selfish. This makes Inder hate his father forever but somewhere inside his soul, Bhajanglal still has love for his son. Inder travels to Thailand with his friend Ronny (Sumeet Vyas) who is also an ambitious song composer. Inder misses his mother, Pammi Bhalla (Supriya Pathak) but hasn't talked to her in many years. Suddenly, Inder gets a phone call from Cheema (Mohammed Zeeshan Ayyub).

Cheema lies to Inder that his father has sold his bakery and wants him to get his share. Unknown to this lie, Inder leaves everything and flies back to India. At the airport he hugs his girlfriend Nimmi (Asin) goodbye, little knowing that she is also travelling to India on the same flight. When Inder and Nimmi reach India they catch the same taxi as Nimmi wants to visit Inder's place. Inder drops Nimmi at his place and then goes to visit Cheema. There he sees his father has been abducted by Cheema and his goons. Inder learns that over the years his father borrowed much money from Cheema due to house needs but couldn't repay it. Cheema warns that if he wants himself and his father to stay alive then he needs to arrange money. Inder and Bhajanglal go home to think of something. There, Inder finds out that his mother is suffering from Alzheimer's disease and Bhajanglal sent her to an ashram. Inder thinks that his father was very selfish but he hasn't learnt the truth yet.

Inder, Bhajanglal, Pammi and Nimmi take a road trip to try to run away from Cheema. They go to a bank on their way and want to take Pammi's brother's money, that Pammi has the actual right to. Bhajanglal is made to sign the form due to Pammi's memory loss. There, Inder learns that his father has divorced his mother. This makes his hatred towards his dad increase. Bhalanglal tells Inder that it wasn't his fault and a dark truth was behind his and Pammi's divorce. After restituting what he has learnt, Inder realises that his father was always innocent and starts loving him again. Inder sell all his songs that he had composed to pay back Cheema, gets his parents married again, marries Nimmi, and renovates his father's bakery. The film ends with Inder, Nimmy, Bhajanglal and Cheema (now their friend) working at the now-profitable bakery.

Cast
Abhishek Bachchan as Inder Bhalla
 Asin as Nimmi Bhalla
 Rishi Kapoor as Bhajanglal Bhalla
 Supriya Pathak as Parminder Bhalla (Pammi)
 Mohammed Zeeshan Ayyub as Cheema
 Seema Bhargava as Mamiji
 Sumeet Vyas as Ronny
 Sonakshi Sinha in cameo appearance in the song Nachan Farrate

Production

Development
Director Shukla spotted many locations for filming in Dubai and different cities in India. After the location was fixed, the whole team including lead actors Abhishek Bachchan and Asin were part of a workshop to prepare shooting for the film.

Filming
Following the two-week workshop from 1 October 2013 involving lead actors Asin and Bachchan, the shooting of the film began on the auspicious Eid on 16 October 2013 which was confirmed by Abhishek Bachchan on Twitter. Director Shukla shot the film in Nashik, Maharashtra, Himachal Pradesh, Sikkim, Dubai, London, Thailand and throughout different cities in India. A part of the filming with Asin was also done in Shimla, Himachal Pradesh.

Release

Box office
The film collected an estimated 2.9 crore on opening day, which is among the lowest first-day totals of 2015. By the third day, the film was thought to have brought in an additional 11.91 crore, and by the end of the fifth day, it was estimated that the film had grossed approximately 159.1 million. By the end of its theatrical run, the film had collected  18.02 crore worldwide. The satellite, music and overseas rights of the film were sold for 25 crore, thus resulting in an overall profit of 11.01 crore (as the total production cost was 32.9 crore).

Critical reception
The film received negative reviews. Mihir Fadnavis, writing for the Hindustan Times, gave the film a rating of 1 out of 5, commenting that "there is no logic to All is Well, and even less comedy. I left the theatre without having laughed once." The Guardian gave the film 2 out of 5 stars, and said that the film "features mopey tunes, torturous exposition – and cuckoo sound effects to help underperforming gags on their way." Raja Sen, writing for Rediff, summarized it as a  "lazy, idiotic film," and rated it 1 out of 5. Srijana Mitra Das of Times of India gave the film 3 stars of 5, praising the performances, but noting that the film seemed dated at times and lacked depth. Bollywood Hungama gave the film 3.5 out of 5, praising the performances of Abhishek and Asin. They further said that, "On the whole, ALL IS WELL is a family entertainer that will effortlessly charm you and gently carve a place in your heart."

Soundtrack

Personnel

 Suhas Parab – producer
 Subhash Parab – producer
 Priyesh Vakil – producer
 Vivek Verma – producer
 Salman Shaikh – engineer
 Sakar Apte – engineer
 Anudutt Shamain – engineer
 Salman Shaikh – mastering
 Vivek Verma – Guitar

The music for All Is Well is composed by Himesh Reshammiya, Amaal Mallik, Mithoon and Meet Bros Anjjan while lyrics are by Shabbir Ahmed, Mayur Puri and Kumaar. The music rights for the film are acquired by T-Series. The album was released on 20 July 2015. Aye Mere Humsafar from the film Qayamat Se Qayamat Tak, composed by Anand–Milind and written by Majrooh Sultanpuri was recreated as Mere Humsafar by Mithoon.

A remix album of the film's soundtrack was released on 10 August 2015 on T-Series YouTube channel which includes three remixed songs of the original album.

References

External links
 

2015 films
2010s Hindi-language films
2010s road comedy-drama films
2015 romantic comedy-drama films
Indian road comedy-drama films
Indian romantic comedy-drama films
Films scored by Amaal Mallik
Films scored by Himesh Reshammiya
Films scored by Mithoon
Films scored by Meet Bros Anjjan
Films about vacationing
T-Series (company) films
Films directed by Umesh Shukla
2015 comedy films
2015 drama films